Özbek is a village in the Urla District of Izmir Province in Turkey.

References 
 Özbek semt merkezi (Özbek neighbourhood centre), Urla District.

Villages in Urla District